Kenen is a surname. Notable people with the surname include:

Isaiah L. Kenen (1905–1988), Canadian-born American journalist, lawyer and philanthropist
Peter Kenen (1932–2012), American economist

See also
Kenan (name)
Kenel